Cross Mountain is a mountain located in the Catskill Mountains of New York south of Phoenicia. Sheridan Mountain is located north, Terrace Mountain is located west, and Romer Mountain is located north of Cross Mountain.

References

Mountains of Ulster County, New York
Mountains of New York (state)